The Grande Côte is a stretch of coastline in Senegal, running north from the Cap-Vert peninsula of Dakar to the border with Mauritania at St-Louis.

A sandy beach runs along the entire coast, which, unlike the Petite Côte, has few settlements – Kayar and Mboro being exceptions. The last stage of the Dakar Rally used to run along the beach. The coastline is also relatively rich in heavy minerals, with significant amounts of zircon having been discovered in the 2000s.

Transport 
In 2012, a railway branch line was proposed to haul mineral sands. In 2014, Grande Côte Operations began operating trains from its mineral sands extraction project. The newly operated branch line consisted of 22km of new alignment to Mékhé, and the rehabilitation of the existing line from there to Dakar, a distance of around 100km.

See also 
 Railway stations in Senegal

References 

Coasts

Geography of Senegal